Owen Owen  was a Welsh Anglican priest in the 16th century.

Owen was born in Anglesey and educated at Christ's College, Cambridge. He held livings at Burton Latimer and Llangeinwen. He was   Archdeacon of Anglesey from 1585 to 1588.

He died in 1592.

References

Alumni of Christ's College, Cambridge
Archdeacons of Anglesey
16th-century Welsh Anglican priests
People from Anglesey
1592 deaths